Grabert is a surname. Notable people with the surname include:

Rob Grabert (born 1964), Dutch volleyball player.
Siegfried Grabert (1916–1942), recipient of the Knight's Cross of the Iron Cross of Nazi Germany.

See also
Grabert Verlag, German publishing company